Alternaria helianthicola is a fungal plant pathogen.

References

External links

helianthicola
Fungal plant pathogens and diseases
Fungi described in 1977